Gospadu is a village in Gospadu mandal, located in Nandyal district of Indian state of Andhra Pradesh.

Geography
Gospadu is located at 15°21'20" N 78°25'9" E. Gospadu is located on state high way SH23 between Nandyal and koilakuntla.

References 

Villages in Nandyal district